Yapchik is a potato-based Ashkenazi Jewish meat dish similar to both cholent and kugel, and of Hungarian Jewish and Polish Jewish origin. It is considered a comfort food, and yapchik has increased in popularity over the past decade, especially among members of the Orthodox Jewish community in North America.

Overview
Yapchik, somewhat similar to a cholent, consists of a layer of meat, typically beef flanken or brisket that has been enveloped between two layers of a mixture similar to a potato kugel, containing shredded potatoes and onions, along with beaten eggs, spices, and matzo meal, and then left to slow-cook for many hours and often overnight. It is a popular dish for Shabbat and many other Jewish holidays.

Other variations

As it is a "heimish" or homestyle dish, there are many variations of yapchik including those made with red potatoes, zucchini, or pulled beef.

In popular culture

A restaurant in the predominantly Jewish city of Lakewood, New Jersey is named after the dish.

References

See also

Potatonik
Cholent

Ashkenazi Jewish cuisine
Ashkenazi Jewish culture in Hungary
Ashkenazi Jewish culture in Poland
Hungarian cuisine
Polish cuisine
Potato dishes